Elections to the Bombay Legislative Assembly were held on 25 February 1957. 1146 candidates contested for the 339 constituencies in the Assembly. There were 57 two-member constituencies and 282 single-member constituencies.

State reorganization
On 1 November 1956, under States Reorganisation Act, 1956, Bombay state was enlarged by the addition of Saurashtra state and Kutch state, the Marathi-speaking districts of Nagpur Division of Madhya Pradesh, and the Marathi speaking Marathwada region of Hyderabad. The state's southernmost Kannada-speaking districts of Dharwad, Bijapur, North Kannada and Belgaum (excluding the Chandgad taluka) were transferred to Mysore state, while Abu Road taluk of the Banaskantha district was transferred to Rajasthan. Hence the constituencies increased from 315 to 396 in 1957 elections.

Results

List of Political Parties participated in 1957 Bombay Assembly Elections.

|-
!colspan=10|
|- style="background-color:#E9E9E9; text-align:center;"
! class="unsortable" |
! Political party !! Flag !! Seats  Contested !! Won !! Net change  in seats 
! Votes !! Vote % !! Change in vote %
|- style="background: #90EE90;"
| 
| style="text-align:left;" |Indian National Congress
| 
| 396 || 234 ||  36  || 81,31,604 || 48.66% ||  1.29%
|-
| 
| style="text-align:left;" |Praja Socialist Party
|
| 98 || 36 ||  27 (from SP) || 14,98,700 || 8.97% ||  2.99% (from SP)
|-
| 
| style="text-align:left;" |Peasants and Workers Party of India
|
| 55 || 31 ||  17 || 11,13,436 || 6.66% ||  0.21%
|-
| 
| style="text-align:left;" |Scheduled Castes Federation
|
| 48 || 13 ||  12 || 10,41,355 || 6.23% ||  3.13%
|-
| 
| style="text-align:left;" |Communist Party of India
| 
| 32 || 13 ||  12 || 6,07,383 || 3.63% ||  2.19%
|-
| 
| style="text-align:left;" |Bharatiya Jana Sangh
|
| 23 || 4 ||  4 || 2,60,826 || 1.56% ||  1.52%
|-
| 
| style="text-align:left;" |Akhil Bharatiya Hindu Mahasabha
|
| 10 || 1 ||  1 || 71,514 || 0.43% ||  0.11%
|-
| 
|
|10|| 0 |||| 14,794|| 0.09%||  1.03%
|-
| 
|
| 400 || 64 ||  45 || 39,72,548 || 23.77% ||  7.53%
|- class="unsortable" style="background-color:#E9E9E9"
! colspan = 3| Total !! 1072 !! 396 !!  81 !! style="text-align:center;" |Turnout (Voters) 1,67,12,160 (3,14,40,079) !! 53.16% !!  2.38%
|}

Elected members

See also

 1957 elections in India
 Bombay State
 1952 Bombay Legislative Assembly election

References

Bombay
State Assembly elections in Maharashtra
1950s in Mumbai
Bombay State
State Assembly elections in Gujarat
February 1957 events in Asia